Faulkner Nunatak is a distinctive nunatak, about  high, just west of Beagle Peak and 9.5 km west by south of Mount Devol in the Lassus Mountains, in the northwest part of Alexander Island, Antarctica. The feature appears in U.S. Navy aerial photographs obtained in 1966. It was named by the Advisory Committee on Antarctic Names after Harold T. Faulkner, U.S. Navy, Leading Chief of Squadron VXE-6 Photo Division on Operation Deep Freeze, 1969.

See also

 Caninus Nunatak
 Geode Nunataks
 Shaw Nunatak

References 

Nunataks of Alexander Island